The 2012 WNBA season is the 7th season for the Chicago Sky of the Women's National Basketball Association.

Transactions

WNBA Draft

Trades and Roster Changes

Roster
{| class="toccolours" style="font-size: 95%; width: 100%;"
|-
! colspan="2"  style="background:#4b90cc; color:#Fbb726"|2012 Chicago Sky Roster
|- style="text-align:center; background-color:#Fbb726; color:#FFFFFF;"
! Players !! Coaches
|- 
| valign="top" |
{| class="sortable" style="background:transparent; margin:0px; width:100%;"
! Pos. !! # !! Nat. !! Name !! Ht. !! Wt. !! From
|-

Depth

Schedule

Preseason

|- align="center" bgcolor="bbffbb"
| 1 || Thu 10 || 8:00 || Washington ||  || 73-68 || Epiphanny Prince (13) || Sylvia Fowles (12) || Courtney Vandersloot (7) || New Trier High School  1,121 || 1-0
|- align="center" bgcolor="bbffbb"
| 2 || Mon 14 || 10:30am || @ New York ||  || 89-57 || Epiphanny Prince (15) || Carolyn Swords (10) || Shey Peddy (4) || Prudential Center  6,397 || 2-0
|- align="center" bgcolor="ffbbbb"
| 3 || Tue 15 || 1:00 || @ Minnesota ||  || 61-82 || Tamera Young (11) || Sylvia Fowles (5) || Ruth Riley (4) || University of Minnesota  4,102 || 2-1
|-

Regular Season

|- align="center" bgcolor="bbffbb"
| 1 || Sat 19 || 7:00 || @ Washington || CN100 || 69-57 || Sylvia Fowles (23) || Sylvia Fowles (12) || PrinceWillinghamVandersloot (3) || Verizon Center  11,415 || 1-0
|- align="center" bgcolor="ffbbbb"
| 2 || Fri 25 || 8:30 || Indiana || CN100 || 72-83 || Sylvia Fowles (21) || Sylvia Fowles (10) || Courtney Vandersloot (4) || Allstate Arena  6,198 || 1-1
|- align="center" bgcolor="bbffbb"
| 3 || Wed 30 || 8:00 || @ San Antonio || CN100 || 77-63 || Sylvia Fowles (23) || Sylvia Fowles (12) || Courtney Vandersloot (7) || AT&T Center  7,233 || 2-1
|-

|- align="center" bgcolor="bbffbb"
| 4 || Fri 1 || 8:30 || Washington || CN100 || 65-63 || Epiphanny Prince (31) || Sylvia Fowles (16) || VanderslootYoung (3) || Allstate Arena  4,078 || 3-1
|- align="center" bgcolor="bbffbb"
| 5 || Sat 2 || 7:00 || @ Atlanta || CN100SSO || 94-92(OT) || Epiphanny Prince (33) || Sylvia Fowles (19) || Courtney Vandersloot (6) || Philips Arena  4,503 || 4-1
|- align="center" bgcolor="bbffbb"
| 6 || Fri 8 || 8:30 || Tulsa || CN100 || 98-91(OT) || Epiphanny Prince (32) || Sylvia Fowles (21) || CashPrinceVandersloot (5) || Allstate Arena  5,019 || 5-1
|- align="center" bgcolor="bbffbb"
| 7 || Sun 10 || 4:00 || @ New York || CN100MSG || 73-64 || Epiphanny Prince (26) || Sylvia Fowles (12) || Courtney Vandersloot (5) || Prudential Center  5,908 || 6-1
|- align="center" bgcolor="bbffbb"
| 8 || Wed 13 || 8:00 || Seattle || CN100 || 74-58 || Epiphanny Prince (17) || Sylvia Fowles (15) || Epiphanny Prince (7) || Allstate Arena  4,681 || 7-1
|- align="center" bgcolor="ffbbbb"
| 9 || Sat 16 || 7:00 || @ Indiana || CN100 || 70-84 || Sylvia Fowles (26) || Tamera Young (7) || CashYoung (3) || Bankers Life Fieldhouse  6,098 || 7-2
|- align="center" bgcolor="ffbbbb"
| 10 || Sat 23 || 12:30 || @ Minnesota || ESPN || 67-79 || Sylvia Fowles (22) || Sylvia Fowles (13) || Courtney Vandersloot (5) || Target Center  9,267 || 7-3
|- align="center" bgcolor="ffbbbb"
| 11 || Wed 27 || 12:30 || Indiana ||  || 72-81 || Sylvia Fowles (19) || Sylvia Fowles (10) || Courtney Vandersloot (4) || Allstate Arena  6,312 || 7-4
|- align="center" bgcolor="ffbbbb"
| 12 || Fri 29 || 8:30 || Phoenix || CN100 || 81-84 || Swin Cash (16) || Sylvia Fowles (10) || Courtney Vandersloot (6) || Allstate Arena  5,488 || 7-5
|-

|- align="center" bgcolor="bbffbb"
| 13 || Sun 1 || 6:00 || Atlanta || CN100 || 71-69 || Sylvia Fowles (21) || Sylvia Fowles (12) || PenicheiroPetrovicVandersloot (4) || Allstate Arena  6,093 || 8-5
|- align="center" bgcolor="ffbbbb"
| 14 || Fri 6 || 8:30 || New York || CN100 || 59-64 || Sylvia Fowles (20) || Sylvia Fowles (9) || Courtney Vandersloot (8) || Allstate Arena  4,211 || 8-6
|- align="center" bgcolor="ffbbbb"
| 15 || Sat 7 || 7:00 || @ Indiana || CN100 || 86-88(OT) || Sylvia Fowles (24) || Sylvia Fowles (16) || Courtney Vandersloot (6) || Bankers Life Fieldhouse  6,155 || 8-7
|- align="center" bgcolor="ffbbbb"
| 16 || Wed 11 || 12:30 || San Antonio ||  || 68-77 || Shay Murphy (20) || Sylvia Fowles (7) || PenicheiroWillingham (3) || Allstate Arena  13,161 || 8-8
|- align="center" bgcolor="ffbbbb"
| 17 || Fri 13 || 8:30 || Connecticut || CN100CPTV-S || 78-80(OT) || Courtney Vandersloot (22) || Sylvia Fowles (10) || Courtney Vandersloot (8) || Allstate Arena  5,988 || 8-9
|-
| colspan="11" align="center" valign="middle" | Summer Olympic break
|-

|-
| colspan="11" align="center" valign="middle" | Summer Olympic break
|- align="center" bgcolor="ffbbbb"
| 18 || Fri 17 || 8:30 || Atlanta || CN100 || 76-82 || Epiphanny Prince (16) || Sylvia Fowles (6) || Epiphanny Prince (3) || Allstate Arena  5,593 || 8-10
|- align="center" bgcolor="ffbbbb"
| 19 || Sun 19 || 4:00 || @ Washington || NBATVCN100CSN-MA || 71-75(OT) || Epiphanny Prince (18) || Sylvia Fowles (16) || CashVandersloot PenicheiroWillingham (2) || Verizon Center  8,489 || 8-11
|- align="center" bgcolor="ffbbbb"
| 20 || Tue 21 || 8:00 || New York || CN100 || 67-77 || Sylvia Fowles (18) || CashFowles (8) || Ticha Penicheiro (7) || Allstate Arena  3,638 || 8-12
|- align="center" bgcolor="ffbbbb"
| 21 || Wed 22 || 7:00 || @ Atlanta || NBATVCN100FS-S || 71-82 || Sylvia Fowles (22) || Sylvia Fowles (6) || Ticha Penicheiro (4) || Philips Arena  4,010 || 8-13
|- align="center" bgcolor="ffbbbb"
| 22 || Fri 24 || 8:00 || @ Tulsa ||  || 78-81 || Courtney Vandersloot (23) || Shay Murphy (10) || Swin Cash (5) || BOK Center  5,147 || 8-14
|- align="center" bgcolor="bbffbb"
| 23 || Sun 26 || 5:00 || @ Connecticut || CPTV-S || 82-70 || Epiphanny Prince (15) || CashSwordsRileyPetrovic (6) || Courtney Vandersloot (11) || Mohegan Sun Arena  8,390 || 9-14
|- align="center" bgcolor="ffbbbb"
| 24 || Tue 28 || 8:00 || Connecticut || CN100CPTV-S || 72-83 || Courtney Vandersloot (17) || Sonja Petrovic (8) || Courtney Vandersloot (6) || Allstate Arena  2,884 || 9-15
|-

|- align="center" bgcolor="ffbbbb"
| 25 || Sat 1 || 7:00 || @ Indiana || NBATVCN100 || 64-81 || Epiphanny Prince (22) || Carolyn Swords (8) || Courtney Vandersloot (5) || Bankers Life Fieldhouse  9,307 || 9-16
|- align="center" bgcolor="bbffbb"
| 26 || Sun 2 || 6:00 || Los Angeles || CN100KDOC || 85-74 || Epiphanny Prince (17) || CashFowles (9) || Epiphanny Prince (9) || Allstate Arena  6,197 || 10-16
|- align="center" bgcolor="bbffbb"
| 27 || Fri 7 || 7:30 || @ New York || CN100MSG || 92-83 || Epiphanny Prince (30) || Swin Cash (7) || CashPrinceVandersloot (4) || Prudential Center  6,145 || 11-16
|- align="center" bgcolor="ffbbbb"
| 28 || Sun 9 || 5:00 || @ Connecticut || CPTV-S || 77-82 || Swin Cash (21) || Swin Cash (15) || PrinceVandersloot (5) || Mohegan Sun Arena  6,658 || 11-17
|- align="center" bgcolor="bbffbb"
| 29 || Tue 11 || 8:00 || Minnesota || CN100 || 83-70 || Epiphanny Prince (26) || Carolyn Swords (9) || Epiphanny Prince (5) || Allstate Arena  4,296 || 12-17
|- align="center" bgcolor="ffbbbb"
| 30 || Thu 13 || 10:30 || @ Los Angeles || NBATVCN100TWC101 || 77-86 || Swin Cash (23) || Swin Cash (6) || Courtney Vandersloot (9) || Staples Center  8,489 || 12-18
|- align="center" bgcolor="bbffbb"
| 31 || Sun 16 || 6:00 || @ Phoenix || NBATVCN100 || 86-55 || Shay Murphy (22) || CashWillingham (8) || Epiphanny Prince (4) || US Airways Center  8,044 || 13-18
|- align="center" bgcolor="ffbbbb"
| 32 || Tue 18 || 10:00 || @ Seattle ||  || 60-75 || Epiphanny Prince (21) || CashPrince (7) || Epiphanny Prince (4) || KeyArena  6,459 || 13-19
|- align="center" bgcolor="ffbbbb"
| 33 || Thu 20 || 8:00 || Atlanta || CN100 || 66-75 || Carolyn Swords (16) || Carolyn Swords (9) || Courtney Vandersloot (6) || Allstate Arena  4,188 || 13-20
|- align="center" bgcolor="bbffbb"
| 34 || Sat 22 || 8:00 || Washington || NBATVCN100 || 77-58 || Courtney Vandersloot (20) || Swin Cash (8) || VanderslootPrince (3) || Allstate Arena  6,721 || 14-20
|-

| All games are viewable on WNBA LiveAccess or ESPN3.com

Standings

Regular Season

Awards and Honors

References

External links

Chicago Sky seasons
Chicago
Chicago Sky